Jim Daly (born 20 December 1972) is a former Irish Fine Gael politician who served as Minister of State for Mental Health and Older People from 2017 to 2020 and Chair of the Committee on Children and Youth Affairs from 2016 to 2017. He served as a Teachta Dála (TD) for the Cork South-West constituency from 2011 to 2020.

Prior to being elected to the Dáil, he was a member of Cork County Council for the Skibbereen local electoral area from 2004 to 2011. He ran unsuccessfully for the Seanad in 2007.

A native of Drinagh, County Cork, Daly is from a family of 11 children. He attended secondary school at Maria Immaculata, Dunmanway.

He studied at NUI Maynooth, and Mary Immaculate College, Limerick, becoming a primary school teacher and he was later Principal of Gaelscoil Dr Uí Shúilleabháin in Skibbereen.

After appearing on Tonight with Vincent Browne in 2012, Daly was diagnosed with skin cancer by a doctor watching at home.

He appeared on Claire Byrne Live on 22 January 2018, where he suggested a government issued ID should be a requirement for logging into social media websites.

On 20 September 2019, he announced that he would not contest the next general election. He is now the CEO of the Private Hospitals Association.

References

 

1972 births
Living people
Alumni of Maynooth University
Alumni of Mary Immaculate College, Limerick
Fine Gael TDs
Irish schoolteachers
Local councillors in County Cork
Members of the 31st Dáil
Members of the 32nd Dáil
Politicians from County Cork
Ministers of State of the 32nd Dáil